The 1987 season was the Minnesota Vikings' 27th year in the National Football League. A players' strike caused the cancellation of the September 27 game at the Kansas City Chiefs, while the games played on October 4, 11 and 18 were played with replacement players. The Vikings finished with an 8–7 record.

Despite finishing the season only one game over .500, and losing three of their final four games, Minnesota sneaked into the playoffs with the final Wild Card position. There, they won two huge upsets, beating the New Orleans Saints (12–3) and San Francisco 49ers (13–2) on the road. The Vikings were unable, however, to defeat the eventual Super Bowl champion Washington Redskins in the NFC Championship Game.

The last remaining active member of the 1987 Minnesota Vikings was quarterback Rich Gannon, who played his final NFL game in the 2004 season, although he missed the 1989 and 1994 seasons.

Offseason

1987 Draft

 The Vikings traded their first- and fifth-round selections (16th and 128th overall) to the Miami Dolphins in exchange for Miami's first-round selection (14th overall).

Staff

Roster

NFL replacement players
After the league decided to use replacement players during the NFLPA strike, the following team was assembled:

Preseason

Regular season

Schedule

Notes:
Intra-division opponents are in bold text.
The October 18 game against Tampa Bay was originally scheduled to be played in Minneapolis. The game was switched with the November 15 game due to Game 2 of the World Series. The game against the Broncos, originally scheduled for October 25, was pushed back to Monday because the Metrodome was being used for Game 7 of the World Series.

Game summaries

Week 11: at Dallas Cowboys

In the Vikings' first game on Thanksgiving for 18 years, starting quarterback Tommy Kramer helped the team to a 14–0 lead by the end of the first quarter, opening with an 11-yard strike to Anthony Carter, before taking the ball in himself from a yard out. However, a bruised throwing arm meant he had to leave the game for a time meant Wade Wilson took over. The Cowboys tied it up with two touchdowns of their own in the second quarter, but another throw from Kramer to Carter, this time from 37 yards, meant the Vikings took a seven-point lead into halftime. Darrin Nelson extended the Vikings' lead with the opening score of the second half, running 52 yards for the Vikings' fourth touchdown of the game. A field goal and another touchdown for the Cowboys reduced the Vikings' lead to four points going into the final quarter, but they restored the two-score margin with a field goal from Chuck Nelson and a 1-yard run from Rick Fenney. The Cowboys managed to come back and tie the game with just over two minutes left to play, enough time for the Vikings to drive downfield and set up a potential game-winning, 46-yard field goal attempt for Chuck Nelson with nine seconds left. He missed the kick and the game went to overtime. Both teams failed with their first two possessions, with both throwing interceptions. Vikings linebacker Scott Studwell returned his interception to the Minnesota 40-yard line to begin their third drive of the extra period. They opened with four straight run plays, including a fourth-down conversion to get them to midfield, followed by a 24-yard pass from Wilson to Carter, before Darrin Nelson ran the remaining distance for the walkoff game-winning touchdown. The result brought the Vikings to a 7–4 record with four games left to play.

Standings

Postseason

Schedule

Game summaries

NFC Wild Card Playoffs: at (#4) New Orleans Saints

In the Saints' first playoff game in history, the Vikings dominated the game by recording two sacks, forcing four turnovers and allowing only 149 yards. The 34-point margin of victory stands as the most lopsided win by an NFC team in a Wild Card round game in NFL history.

NFC Divisional Playoffs: at (#1) San Francisco 49ers

The heavy underdog Vikings pulled off a shocker in San Francisco, controlling most of the game with Anthony Carter leading the way with 227 receiving yards.

NFC Championship Game: at (#3) Washington Redskins

In a defensive battle, the Redskins played a little better by limiting the Vikings to only 76 rushing yards and forcing eight sacks. Washington scored first on a 98-yard drive that was capped by running back Kelvin Bryant's 42-yard touchdown reception from quarterback Doug Williams. However, Minnesota tied the game before halftime with quarterback Wade Wilson's 23-yard touchdown pass to Leo Lewis. In the third quarter, Redskins linebacker Mel Kaufman returned an interception 10 yards to the Minnesota 17-yard line to set up kicker Ali Haji-Sheikh's 28-yard field goal. In the final period, Vikings kicker Chuck Nelson made an 18-yard field goal to tie the game, 10–10. The Redskins then marched 70 yards to score on Williams' 7-yard touchdown pass to wide receiver Gary Clark to take the lead, 17–10, with 5:06 remaining in the game. Minnesota then advanced to the Washington 6-yard line, but Wilson's fourth down pass, intended for running back Darrin Nelson in the end zone was defended by Darrell Green with 52 seconds remaining and the Redskins ran out the clock.

Statistics

Team leaders

League rankings

References

External links
 Vikings on Pro Football Reference
 Vikings on jt-sw.com

1987
Minnesota
Minnesota Vikings